Trichromia postsuffusa is a moth of the family Erebidae. It was described by Walter Rothschild in 1922. It is found in Guyana and Brazil.

Subspecies
Trichromia postsuffusa postsuffusa (Guyana)
Trichromia postsuffusa pallida (Rothschild, 1922) (Brazil: Para)

References

postsuffusa
Moths described in 1922